Mame Ibra Touré (born 23 April 1971) is a retired Senegalese football midfielder.

Touré was capped for Senegal and was a squad member for the 2000 African Cup of Nations. He played club football for AS Douanes, ASC Ndiambour and SONACOS.

References

1971 births
Living people
Senegalese footballers
AS Douanes (Senegal) players
Senegal international footballers
2000 African Cup of Nations players
Association football midfielders